Kyowa Dam  is a rockfill dam located in Hokkaido Prefecture in Japan. The dam is used for irrigation. The catchment area of the dam is 14.3 km2. The dam impounds about 26  ha of land when full and can store 3200 thousand cubic meters of water. The construction of the dam was started on 1978 and completed in 1995.

References

Dams in Hokkaido